Ibargüen is the name of:

 Alberto Ibargüen (born 1944), American newspaper publisher and nonprofit leader
 Andrés Ibargüen (born 1992), Colombian footballer
 Arley Ibargüen (born 1982), Colombian javelin thrower
 Carlos Ibargüen (born 1995), Colombian footballer
 Carlos Ibargüen Parra (born 1990), Colombian footballer 
 Caterine Ibargüen (born 1984), Colombian long and triple jumper
 Giancarlo Ibárgüen (1963–2016), Guatemalan businessman and academic